is a Prefectural Natural Park in southwest Hokkaidō, Japan. Established in 1968, the park spans the municipalities of Fukushima, Matsumae, and Shiriuchi.

See also
 National Parks of Japan

References

External links 
  Map of Natural Parks of Hokkaidō
  Map of Matsumae Yagoshi Prefectural Natural Park

Parks and gardens in Hokkaido
Protected areas established in 1968
1968 establishments in Japan